Serotonergic or serotoninergic means "pertaining to or affecting serotonin". Serotonin is a neurotransmitter. A synapse is serotonergic if it uses serotonin as its neurotransmitter. A serotonergic neuron produces serotonin. A substance is serotonergic if it produces its effects via interactions with the serotonin system, such as by stimulating or blocking neurotransmission.

A serotonergic or serotoninergic agent is any chemical that modifies the effects of serotonin in the body. Some different types of serotonergics drugs include the following:

 Serotonin receptor agonists and antagonists
 Serotonin reuptake inhibitors
 Serotonin releasing agents

See also

References

Parasympathetic nervous system
Neurochemistry
Neurotransmitters
Serotonin